Hecuba is a band based in Los Angeles, California featuring performance artist Isabelle Albuquerque and musician and designer Jon Beasley. They have toured with Devendra Banhart, Bat for Lashes and Rainbow Arabia. They have released two albums on Manimal Vinyl since their formation in 2006. Their second release, Paradise, has received favorable reviews from NME, Pitchfork Media, LA Weekly and XLR8R. They performed at the Los Angeles premier of Wild Combination: a film about Arthur Russell (musician) performing their versions of Russell's music. Their third album "Modern" was released in 2012 on the LA-based label Germ.

Discography
 Sir 12"/Download (April 2008 Manimal Vinyl)
 Paradise LP/CD/Download (May 2009 Manimal Vinyl)
 "Modern" LP/CD/Download (2012 Germ)

Singles
Suffering April 2009
The Magic August 2009

References

External links

Hecuba official site
Official Myspace
Manimal Vinyl Official Site
Manimal Vinyl at MySpace
Bat for Lashes at Discogs
Sarcastic Laist interview with an intern posing as Paul Beahan
Reviews of Manimal Festival 2008
Pitchforkmedia Review of Madonna Tribute
Pitchfork News Article on Upcoming tribute to The Cure
Spin Magazine Review of Madonna Tribute Record

Freak folk
Musical groups from Los Angeles